Viktor Ahlmann Nielsen (born 3 January 1995) is a Danish former professional footballer who played as a forward. He is the brother of fellow footballer Jakob Ahlmann Nielsen.

Career
Ahlmann is a youth prospect of AaB. During the autumn holidays of 2008, Ahlmann, together with teammates from AaB, Lucas Andersen and Andreas Bruhn, participated in a trial at Premier League club Liverpool. He made his Danish Superliga debut on 19 July 2014 against SønderjyskE where he was substituted in for Anders K. Jacobsen in the 82nd minute. He played seven league games in AaB. In the fall of 2015, Ahlmann was sent on loan to Vendsyssel FF. In the spring of 2016, he was sent on a six-month loan to Jammerbugt FC, where he scored nine goals in 16 appearances.

After his contract expired with AaB, he signed with Norwegian club IF Fram Larvik in August 2016. He, however, announced on social media that he had decided to take a break from football only one month after joining Fram, due to a lack of motivation for professional football.

Ahlmann returned to football in February 2017, signing with his former side Jammerbugt FC in the third-tier Danish 2nd Division. Ahlmann left Jammerbugt at the end of the 2020–21 season, and subsequently retired from football altogether.

References

External links
 

1995 births
Living people
Danish men's footballers
AaB Fodbold players
Vendsyssel FF players
Danish Superliga players
Association football forwards
People from Brønderslev
Jammerbugt FC players
Danish 2nd Division players
IF Fram Larvik players
Danish expatriate men's footballers
Expatriate footballers in Norway
Danish expatriate sportspeople in Norway
Denmark youth international footballers
Sportspeople from the North Jutland Region